Emlyn Mulligan is a Gaelic footballer from County Leitrim who plays for the Sligo based St Mary's club and formerly for the Leitrim county team. A top class free-taker, he scored 1–34 in the 2008 National Football League. The high point of his career came in captaining Leitrim to the FBD Insurance League in 2013 - though it a notable achievement in this case as it was only Leitrim's fourth ever trophy and their first since 1994. He is widely considered as one of the greatest ever players to grace the Connacht championship. He scored 3–8 in New York in 2013, described by experts as "some feat". He took a year out to go travelling ahead of Leitrim's 2015 campaign.

A Garda, he has also played soccer with Sligo Rovers. He has played for Connacht too, helping them to a first Interprovincial Championship for over 40 years in 2014.

After four years with the Dublin GAA club St Brigid's, Mulligan returned to his native Melvin Gaels in 2017 and, in January 2021, residing in Sligo, he transferred from Melvin Gaels to the St Mary's club. He did so having left the Leitrim team in 2019 following a third injury to his knee and went uncalled for by his county in 2020.

He also served as a selector with the Leitrim minor team. Mulligan then moved up to the Leitrim under-20 team in 2021 when Brendan Guckian (1994 Connacht Senior Football Championship winner) went there.

Honours
 Leitrim Senior Football Championship (1): 2012
 FBD Insurance League (2): 2013 (c), 2014 (c)
 Interprovincial Championship (1): 2014

References

External links
 Official profile

Year of birth missing (living people)
Living people
Connacht inter-provincial Gaelic footballers
Donegal Boston Gaelic footballers
Gaelic footballers who switched code
Gaelic football forwards
Gaelic football selectors
Garda Síochána officers
Leitrim inter-county Gaelic footballers
Melvin Gaels Gaelic footballers
St Brigid's (Dublin) Gaelic footballers
Sligo Rovers F.C. players
Association footballers not categorized by position
Republic of Ireland association footballers
Sportspeople from County Leitrim